The Denmark Strait cataract is an undersea waterfall found on the western side of the Denmark Strait in the Atlantic Ocean, on the Arctic Circle between Iceland and Greenland. It is the world's highest underwater waterfall, with water falling almost 3,505 meters (11,500 feet).

It is formed by the density difference of the water masses either side of the Denmark Strait, the eastern side being colder than the western. Due to this difference, when the two masses meet along the top ridge of the strait, the colder, denser water flows downwards and underneath the warmer, less dense water.

It is thought that the Denmark Strait cataract has a flow rate exceeding 175 million cubic feet (5.0 million cubic meters) per second, making it 350 times as voluminous as the extinct Guaíra Falls on the border of Brazil and Paraguay, which was once thought to be the most voluminous waterfall on Earth, and which itself was 12 times more voluminous than Victoria Falls.

The Danish name of the waterfall, Grønlandspumpen, and the Norwegian, Grønlandspumpa, mean the Greenland Pump.

References

External links

 North Atlantic Circulation Pump
 Diagrams in New Scientist, 2012
 Diagram on the website of the National Ocean Service
 Proc. ‘Envisat Symposium 2007’, Montreux, Switzerland 23–27 April 2007 (ESA SP-636, July 2007)
 La circulation oceanique

Waterfalls of Greenland
Waterfalls of Iceland